Tendencia Revolucionaria (lit. Revolutionary Tendency) was a group of  left-wing Peronist organizations, who opposed his counterpart orthodox Peronism and the right peronism. Tendencia Revolucionaria formalized as an organization in the early 1970s prior to the March 1973 elections. Its objective was to bring Juan Perón back to Argentina and making Argentina socialist. Tendencia Revolucionaria was made up by: 
Montonero organizations
Juventud Peronista Regionales
Movimiento Villero Peronista
Juventud Universitaria Peronista
Juventud de Trabajadores Peronistas
Unión de Estudiantes Secundarios
Movimiento de Inquilinos  Peronistas
Fuerzas Armadas Revolucionarias
The organization included minority factions from: 
Fuerzas Armadas Peronistas
Peronismo de Base

Perón used Chilean President Salvador Allende as a warning example for Tendencia Revolucionaria. In September just a few days before the 1973 Chilean coup d'etat he addressed the organization:

The campaign of Tendencia Revolucionaria is credited for the election of Oscar Bidegain as Governor of Buenos Aires Province in 1973. Bidegain reciprocated by proclaiming amnesty for some incarcerated members of Tendencia Revolucionaria, a move Bidegain's Peronist ally Héctor Cámpora also promised as part of his presidential campaign. However Bidegain's running mate and subsequent vicegovernor Victorio Calabró was disliked by Tendencia Revolucionaria. He was seen as a right-wing bureaucratic syndicalist. One of the first setbacks of Tendencia Revolucionaria was Peróns sacking of Rodolfo Galimberti in April 1973 after the latters call to form militias. As Perón arrived to Argentina in June 1973 Tendencia Revolucionaria suffered a major rift as some considered that any armed struggle was no longer needed while others insisted on its necessity. Another setback came on January 20, 1974 when People's Revolutionary Army attacked the Azul garrison. This resulted in Perón criticizing Bidegain who resigned after facing pressure from the Camber of Deputies. To the dismay of Tendencia Revolucionaria Victorio Calabró succeeded him as governor. After the death of Perón in 1974 Tendencia Revolucionaria lost influence and suffered a series of internal rifts.

References

Peronism
Far-left politics
Socialism in Argentina
Anti-fascism
Anti-capitalism